The Maharaja of Travancore was the principal title of the ruler of the Kingdom of Travancore in the southern part of Kerala, India. The Maharaja of Travancore was the topmost ruler of Travancore until 1949, when Travancore was annexed into India. Since then, the Maharaja of Travancore remains as a titular position.

Maharajas of the Kingdom of Travancore

Titular Maharaja
After British India became independent as two dominions in 1947, Chithira Thirunal agreed to accede his state to the new Dominion of India. Travancore was united with the neighbouring Cochin state and Chithira Thirunal served as Rajpramukh of the Travancore-Cochin Union from 1 July 1949 to 31 October 1956, which was the entire duration of the existence of that political entity. On 1 November 1956, the state of Kerala was created by uniting the Malayalam-speaking areas of the Travancore-Cochin Union with those of neighbouring Madras State, and Sree Chithira Thirunal's office of Rajpramukh came to an end. On 28 December 1971, Chithira Thirunal lost his privy purse and other privileges when the Indian government derecognized the rulers of the erstwhile princely states. Since then the head of the Travancore royal family is the pretender to the abolished title. The titular Maharaja fulfils his duties as Maharaja of Travancore in rituals related to the Padmanabhaswamy Temple. In 2012, the High Court of Kerala in a judgement on Mujeeba Rahman vs the State Of Kerala stated that, 'though by the 26th amendment of the Constitution, Article 363 was repealed whereby the rights and privileges of the rulers of Indian States were taken away, still the name and title of the rulers remained as such and unaffected in so far as names and titles were not contemplated as rights or privileges under the repealed Articles 291 and 362 of the Constitution.' So the titles were not abolished by the Government; only their political powers and right to receive Privy Purse were cancelled.

See also
Kingdom of Travancore
Travancore royal family
British Raj

References

External links
http://www.deccanchronicle.com/140103/news-current-affairs/article/moolam-thirunal-anointed-head-travancore-royal-house

Travancore